The 1875 Maryland gubernatorial election took place on November 2, 1875.

Incumbent Democratic Governor James Black Groome did not seek re-election, having withdrawn his name from consideration prior to the Democratic state convention.

Democratic candidate John Lee Carroll defeated Republican candidate James Morrison Harris.

General election

Candidates
John Lee Carroll, Democratic, State Senator
James Morrison Harris, Republican, former U.S. Congressman

Results

Notes

References

1875
Gubernatorial
Maryland